Daniel Eduardo Brizuela (born 29 December 1985) is an Argentine professional boxer. As an amateur he competed for Argentina at the 2004 Summer Olympics in Athens, where he was stopped in the first round of the men's featherweight event by Germany's Vitali Tajbert.

He earned Olympic qualification as a semi-finalist at the 2nd AIBA American 2004 Olympic Qualifying Tournament. American Aaron Garcia won the original qualification berth, but was dropped after he failed to qualify at the US Olympic trials.

His fight with British Champion Tommy Coyle is cited as one of the greatest fights inside a British ring, with 7 knockdowns and a dramatic final round finish.

Professional boxing record 

|-
| style="text-align:center;" colspan="8"|28 Wins (8 knockouts), 8 Losses, 2 Draws
|-  style="text-align:center; background:#e3e3e3;"
|  style="border-style:none none solid solid; "|Res.
|  style="border-style:none none solid solid; "|Record
|  style="border-style:none none solid solid; "|Opponent
|  style="border-style:none none solid solid; "|Type
|  style="border-style:none none solid solid; "|Rd.,Time
|  style="border-style:none none solid solid; "|Date
|  style="border-style:none none solid solid; "|Location
|  style="border-style:none none solid solid; "|Notes
|- align=center
|Loss||28–8–2||align=left| Pablo Manuel Ojeda
|
|
|
|align=left|
|align=left|
|- align=center
|Loss||28–7–2||align=left| Matias Rueda
|
|
|
|align=left|
|align=left|
|- align=center
|Loss||28–6–2||align=left| Stephen Smith
|
|
|
|align=left|
|align=left| 
|- align=center
|Loss||28–5–2||align=left| Mauricio Javier Munoz
|
|
|
|align=left|
|align=left|
|- align=center
|Win||28–4–2||align=left| Marcos Gabriel Martinez
|
|
|
|align=left|
|align=left|
|- align=center
|Win||27–4–2||align=left| Roberto Joaquin Iturra
|
|
|
|align=left|
|align=left|
|- align=center
|Loss||26-4-2||align=left| Luke Campbell
|
|
|
|align=left|
|align=left|
|- align=center
|Win||26–3–2||align=left| Jorge Samuel Fredes
|
|
|
|align=left|
|align=left|
|- align=center
|Loss||25–3–2||align=left| Tommy Coyle
|
|
|
|align=left|
|align=left|
|- align=center
|Loss||25–2–2||align=left| Daud Yordan
|
|
|
|align=left|
|align=left|
|- align=center
|Win||25–1–2||align=left| Diego Alberto Chaves
|
|
|
|align=left|
|align=left|
|- align=center
|Win||24–1–2||align=left| Mario Julio Ruben Martinez
|
|
|
|align=left|
|align=left|
|- align=center
|Win||23–1–2||align=left| Miguel Leonardo Caceres
|
|
|
|align=left|
|align=left|
|- align=center
|Win||22–1–2||align=left| Julio Cesar Ruiz
|
|
|
|align=left|
|align=left|
|- align=center
|Draw||21–1–2||align=left| Gustavo David Bermudez
|
|
|
|align=left|
|align=left|
|- align=center
|Win||21–1–1||align=left| Adrian Marcelo Flamenco
|
|
|
|align=left|
|align=left|
|- align=center
|Win||20–1–1||align=left| Ricardo Fabricio Chamorro
|
|
|
|align=left|
|align=left|
|- align=center
|Win||19–1–1||align=left| Cristian David Serrano
|
|
|
|align=left|
|align=left|
|- align=center
|Win||18–1–1||align=left| Jorge Andres Ferreira
|
|
|
|align=left|
|align=left|
|- align=center
|Loss||17–1–1||align=left| Daniel Alberto Dorrego
|
|
|
|align=left|
|align=left|
|- align=center
|Win||17–0–1||align=left| Marcelo Omar Lazarte
|
|
|
|align=left|
|align=left|
|- align=center
|Win||16–0–1||align=left| Miguel Dario Lombardo
|
|
|
|align=left|
|align=left|
|- align=center
|Win||15–0–1||align=left| Diego Alejandro Madole
|
|
|
|align=left|
|align=left|
|- align=center
|Win||14–0–1||align=left| Eduardo Daniel Roman
|
|
|
|align=left|
|align=left|
|- align=center
|Draw||13-0-1||align=left| Diego Alejandro Madole
|
|
|
|align=left|
|align=left|
|- align=center
|Win||13-0||align=left| Sergio Eduardo Gonzalez
|
|
|
|align=left|
|align=left|
|- align=center

References
sports-reference

External links

1985 births
Living people
Featherweight boxers
Boxers at the 2003 Pan American Games
Boxers at the 2004 Summer Olympics
Olympic boxers of Argentina
Argentine male boxers
Pan American Games competitors for Argentina
Sportspeople from Mendoza Province